Boi is a 2019 Spanish thriller film directed and written by Jorge M. Fontana.

Cast 
 Bernat Quintana as Boi
 Andrew Lua as Michael
 Adrian Pang as Gordon
 Anatoly Chugunov as Mafioso
 Miranda Gas as Anna
 Macarena Gómez as Dueña Club Privado
 Rachel Lascar as Mme. Tabard
 Pol López as Felipe
 Man Mourentan as Mou
 Jean Claude Ricquebourg as Eduardo
 Fina Rius as Tia Boi

Release
Carlos Aguilar writing for the Los Angeles Times gave the film a bad review, stating: "'Boi', from first-time Spanish writer-director Jorge M. Fontana, aims to examine an individual with unfulfilled artistic aspirations wrapped in a cryptic thriller; however, its stylish features overpower its many attempts at philosophical depth." Helen T. Verongos from the New York Times also disliked the movie, writing: "The tantalizing clues, occasional laughs, and lapses, in reality, are not enough to hold this film together."

References

External links 
 
 

2019 films
2019 thriller films
Spanish thriller films
Spanish-language Netflix original films
2010s Spanish-language films
Aquí y Allí Films films